Costișa is a commune in Neamț County, Western Moldavia, Romania. It is composed of four villages: Costișa, Dornești, Frunzeni and Mănoaia.

References

External links

Communes in Neamț County
Localities in Western Moldavia